Joe Cool's Blues is an album by jazz trumpeter Wynton Marsalis and his father Ellis Marsalis that was released in 1995. The album reached a peak position of No. 3 on Billboards Top Jazz Albums chart.

The album consists of a series of songs inspired by the Peanuts comic strip and television specials. Half of the songs are cover versions of pieces by Vince Guaraldi, who composed for the Peanuts franchise from 1965 until his death in 1976; the remainder are original compositions by Wynton Marsalis.

Track listing

Personnel

Wynton Marsalis Septet
 Wynton Marsalis – trumpet
 Eric Reed – piano
 Wessell Anderson – soprano and alto saxophones
 Victor Goines – tenor saxophone, clarinet
 Wycliffe Gordon – trombone
 Ben Wolfe – double bass, bass guitar
 Herlin Riley – drums

Ellis Marsalis Trio
 Ellis Marsalis – piano
 Reginald Veal – bass 
 Martin Butler – drums

Additional personnel
 Branford Marsalis – tenor saxophone ("Little Birdie")
 Chuck Findley – trumpet ("Little Birdie")
 Tom Peterson – baritone saxophone ("Little Birdie")
 Germaine Bazzle – vocals ("Little Birdie")
 George Butler – executive producer
 Delfeayo Marsalis – trombone ("Little Birdie"), producer, mixing, mastering
 Stanley Crouch – liner notes

Credits adapted from AllMusic and Discogs.

References

1995 albums
Collaborative albums
Columbia Records albums
Wynton Marsalis albums
Peanuts music
Vince Guaraldi tribute albums
20th-century jazz composers
20th-century American pianists
20th-century American composers
Animation composers
Albums produced by George Butler (record producer)